Nina Catherine Muir (20 October 1900–9 June 1981) was a New Zealand medical doctor.

Early life 
Nina Muir (née Howard) was born in Dunedin, New Zealand in 1900. Her father was Dr Ernest Henry Howard (d. 1954) who practised in Murchison and Taumarunui where he was superintendent of the hospital. Muir went to school at Auckland Girls' Grammar School and graduated from the University of Otago medical school in 1926.

Career 
In 1927 Muir became the first woman house surgeon at Wellington Hospital. On moving to Gisborne she worked at Cook Hospital and Te Puia Hospital, attending births and treating patients in remote areas. After her marriage she became the first general practitioner to practise in the maternity unit of Cook Hospital. In 1949–1950 she did a postgraduate diploma in obstetrics and gynaecology at the Rotunda Hospital in Dublin. 

During the 1940s Muir was the president of the East Coast branch of the British Medical Association.

Personal life 
In 1929 she married Percy Rutherford Muir, a Gisborne journalist and printer, whose family owned the Poverty Bay Herald. They had two daughters.

Muir died in Gisborne in 1981.

References

1900 births
1981 deaths
New Zealand women medical doctors
20th-century New Zealand medical doctors
People from Dunedin in health professions
20th-century women physicians
University of Otago alumni
New Zealand general practitioners